Michigan's 107th House of Representatives district (also referred to as Michigan's 107th House district) is a legislative district within the Michigan House of Representatives located in parts of Cheboygan, Chippewa, and Mackinac counties, as well as all of Charlevoix and Emmet counties. The district was created in 1965, when the Michigan House of Representatives district naming scheme changed from a county-based system to a numerical one.

List of representatives

Recent Elections

Historical district boundaries

References 

Michigan House of Representatives districts
Chippewa County, Michigan
Emmet County, Michigan
Mackinac County, Michigan
Cheboygan County, Michigan